I Love That Man is a 1933 American pre-Code drama film directed by Harry Joe Brown and written by C. Graham Baker, Casey Robinson and Gene Towne. The film stars Edmund Lowe, Nancy Carroll, Robert Armstrong, Lew Cody, Warren Hymer, Grant Mitchell and Dorothy Burgess. The film was released on June 9, 1933, by Paramount Pictures.

The film's sets were designed by the art director David S. Garber.

Plot

Cast  
Edmund Lowe as Brains Stanley / Roger Winthrop
Nancy Carroll as Grace Clark
Robert Armstrong as Driller
Lew Cody as Labels Castell
Warren Hymer as Mousey
Grant Mitchell as Dr. Crittenden 
Dorothy Burgess as Ethel
Walter Walker as Mr. Walker
Berton Churchill as Mordant
Susan Fleming as Miss Jones 
Luis Alberni as Angelo
Lee Kohlmar as Old Man Cohen
Harvey Clark as Fred J. Harper
Belle Mitchell as Maria 
Leon Holmes as Abe
Esther Muir as Babe 
Patrick H. O'Malley, Jr. as Prison Interne
Lloyd Ingraham as Ace

References

External links 
 

1933 films
American drama films
1933 drama films
Paramount Pictures films
Films directed by Harry Joe Brown
American black-and-white films
1930s English-language films
1930s American films
Films scored by Bernhard Kaun
Films scored by Karl Hajos
Films scored by John Leipold